Sophia Rosoff (January 26, 1924 - November 22, 2017) was an American pianist and educator, and a founder of the Abby Whiteside Foundation.

She was a co-editor of the reprinted collection of Abby Whiteside's writings, along with Joseph Prostakoff.

Her pupils have included the jazz pianists Brad Mehldau, Jeremy Siskind, Fred Hersch, Barry Harris, Ethan Iverson, Benoit Delbecq, Angelica Sanchez, Monique diMattina and Aaron Parks.

References

American pianists
American women pianists
1924 births
2017 deaths
21st-century American women